The Order of the Republic is the premier order of the state of Sierra Leone. It was established by President Siaka Stevens in 1972, to honour Sierra Leoneans and foreign nationals for distinguished and dedicated service to Sierra Leone.

Sierra Leonean awards, including the Order of the Republic, do not have post-nominal titles and, while there are no official abbreviations, the most common used unofficially are GCRSL (Grand Commander), CRSL (Commander) and GORSL (Grand Officer).

Classes 
The order originally had four classes, but currently comprises three:
 Grand Commander (GCRSL)
 Commander (CRSL)
 Grand Officer (GORSL)

Insignia 
The ribbon has three vertical stripes: green, white, and blue, representing the colours of the flag of Sierra Leone.

A ceremony to present insignia is undertaken annually by the President of Sierra Leone on Independence Day, 27 April.

Notable recipients 

 Dr. Thomas Kahota Kargbo (GCOR), 2014
 Francis Minah (GCOR), 1981
 Ibrahim Rassin Bundu (CRSL), 2014
 Victor Bockarie Foh (CRSL), 2014
 Harold Hanciles J.P. (CRSL), 2014
 Phillipson Humaro Kamara (CRSL), 2014
 Samura Matthew Wilson Kamara (CRSL), 2014
 Dr. Bernadette Lahai (CRSL), 2014
 General Sir David Julian Richards (CRSL), 2014
 King Salman of Saudi Arabia (CRSL), 2017
 Michael von der Schulenburg (GCRSL), 2020
 Ajibola Emmanuel Manly Spain (CRSL), 2014

See also
 Order of the Rokel
 Presidential Award

References

External links
 Republic of Sierra Leone: Order of the Republic

Republic (Sierra Leone), Order of the
Awards established in 1972
1972 establishments in Sierra Leone